The Mumbly Cartoon Show is a Saturday morning animated series produced by Hanna-Barbera Productions and featuring the titular Mumbly, a cartoon dog detective. It was broadcast on ABC from September 11, 1976 to September 3, 1977 as part of The Tom and Jerry/Grape Ape/Mumbly Show. This compilation packaged reruns of the 1975 The Tom and Jerry/Grape Ape Show with Mumbly as a new component.

Mumbly is a private eye dog in a trenchcoat, who works with a human detective, Chief Schnooker, to catch criminals who often sport alliterative names. 16 episodes were produced. Mumbly was voiced by Don Messick, and Schnooker by John Stephenson.

The show was not a ratings success, and only lasted one season. However, in the next season, Mumbly was included in Hanna-Barbera's crossover show, Laff-A-Lympics, on the villainous "Really Rottens" team. Mumbly was not a villain in his earlier show, but the character was a substitution for the actually-villainous Muttley from the 1969 series Wacky Races, who could not appear on Laff-A-Lympics as those characters were co-owned by Heatter-Quigley Productions. A predecessor to Muttley and Mumbly is the dog Mugger, he appears in the 1964 movie Hey There, It's Yogi Bear!.

The show was also broadcast in West Germany in 1982, Yugoslavia circa 1985/1986, France in 1978, Poland circa 1983/1984.

Episodes

* Telecast at Noon (EST), Thursday afternoon, November 25, 1976, a Thanksgiving, as part of ABC's Thanksgiving Funshine Festival.

Other appearances
 Chief Schnooker makes a cameo in the Harvey Birdman, Attorney at Law episode "SPF".
 Mumbly is shown on a list in the Velma episode "Velma Makes a List".

References

External links

 The Mumbly Cartoon Show at Aaron's New Tom and Jerry Information Site
Mumbly at Don Markstein's Toonopedia. Archived from the original on March 10, 2016.

1976 American television series debuts
1977 American television series endings
1970s American animated television series
American children's animated comedy television series
American children's animated mystery television series
American detective television series
American Broadcasting Company original programming
Animated television series about dogs
English-language television shows
Television series by Hanna-Barbera